Samuel Onyedikachuwu Nnamani (born 3 June 1995) is a Nigerian football forward.

Career
Nnamani arrived in Serbia in 2014, and joined Sloga Petrovac na Mlavi, but he didn't get a chance in official match. In winter break off-season 2014–15, he signed with Jagodina. He made his professional debut for Jagodina in Serbian SuperLiga on 7 March 2015 against Radnički Niš.

References

External links
 
 Nnamani Onyedikachuwu stats at utakmica.rs 
 

1995 births
Living people
Association football forwards
Nigerian footballers
Nigerian expatriate footballers
Nigerian expatriate sportspeople in Serbia
Expatriate footballers in Serbia
FK Sloga Petrovac na Mlavi players
FK Jagodina players
FK Donji Srem players
FK Sloboda Užice players
Serbian First League players
Serbian SuperLiga players
AFC Eskilstuna players
Superettan players
Expatriate footballers in Sweden
Jeonnam Dragons players
K League 2 players
Expatriate footballers in South Korea